Catriona rickettsi, common name Doc's aeolid, is a species of sea slug, an aeolid nudibranch, a marine gastropod mollusc in the family Trinchesiidae.

References

Trinchesiidae
Gastropods described in 1984